Oracle Corporation is an American multinational computer technology corporation headquartered in Austin, Texas. In 2020, Oracle was the third-largest software company in the world by revenue and market capitalization. The company sells database software and technology (particularly its own brands), cloud engineered systems, and enterprise software products, such as enterprise resource planning (ERP) software, human capital management (HCM) software, customer relationship management (CRM)  software (also known as customer experience), enterprise performance management (EPM) software, and supply chain management (SCM) software.

History

Larry Ellison co-founded Oracle Corporation in 1977 with Bob Miner and Ed Oates under the name Software Development Laboratories (SDL). Ellison took inspiration from the 1970 paper written by Edgar F. Codd on relational database management systems (RDBMS) named "A Relational Model of Data for Large Shared Data Banks." He heard about the IBM System R database from an article in the IBM Research Journal provided by Oates. Ellison wanted to make Oracle's product compatible with System R, but failed to do so as IBM kept the error codes for their DBMS a secret. SDL changed its name to Relational Software, Inc (RSI) in 1979, then again to Oracle Systems Corporation in 1983, to align itself more closely with its flagship product Oracle Database. The name also drew from the 1977 CIA project codename, which was also Oracle's first customer. At this stage Bob Miner served as the company's senior programmer. On March 12, 1986, the company had its initial public offering.

In 1989, Oracle moved its world headquarters to the Redwood Shores neighborhood of Redwood City, California, though its campus was not completed until 1995. 

In 1995, Oracle Systems Corporation changed its name to Oracle Corporation, officially named Oracle, but is sometimes referred to as Oracle Corporation, the name of the holding company. Part of Oracle Corporation's early success arose from using the C programming language to implement its products. This eased porting to different operating systems most of which support C.

In 2005, Oracle acquired PeopleSoft, an ERP company, and in 2006 Siebel, a CRM company. In 2008 Oracle acquired BEA Systems, an enterprise infrastructure software company and in 2010 it acquired Sun Microsystems, a computer hardware and software company (famous for its Java programming language).

On July 15, 2013, Oracle transferred its stock listing from the Nasdaq to the NYSE. At the time, it was the largest-ever U.S. market transfer.

In an effort to compete with Amazon Web Services and its products, Oracle announced in 2019 it was partnering with former rival Microsoft. The alliance called that Oracle Cloud and Microsoft Azure would be directly connected, allowing customers of each to store data on both cloud computing platforms and run software on either Oracle or Azure. Some saw this not only as an attempt to compete with Amazon but also Google and Salesforce, which acquired Looker and Tableau Software, respectively.

On December 11, 2020, Oracle announced that it was moving its world headquarters from Redwood Shores to Austin, Texas.

On December 20, 2021, Oracle announced the acquisition of Cerner, a health information technology company. The next day, on December 21, Oracle made public the acquisition of Federos, an AI and automation tools company for network performance. The acquisition of Cerner was completed in June 2022 for $28.3 billion in cash.

On August 23, 2022, Oracle was hit with a class action lawsuit, which alleges that Oracle has been operating a "surveillance machine" which tracks in real-time and records indefinitely the personal information of hundreds of millions of people.

In February 2023, the company announced it was going to invest $1.5 billion into the Kingdom of Saudi Arabia as a part of the on-going tech investment in the country. As a part of the investment, Oracle will be opening a data centre in the country's capital, Riyadh.

Products and services
Oracle designs, manufactures, and sells both software and hardware products and offers services that complement them (such as financing, training, consulting, and hosting services). Many of the products have been added to Oracle's portfolio through acquisitions.

Software
Oracle's E-delivery service (Oracle Software Delivery Cloud) provides generic downloadable Oracle software and documentation.

Databases
 Oracle Database
 Release 10: In 2004, Oracle Corporation shipped release 10g (g standing for "grid") as the then latest version of Oracle Database. (Oracle Application Server 10g using Java EE integrated with the server part of that version of the database, making it possible to deploy web-technology applications. The application server was the first middle-tier software designed for grid computing. The interrelationship between Oracle 10g and Java allowed developers to set up stored procedures written in the Java language, as well as, those written in the traditional Oracle database programming language, PL/SQL.)
 Release 11: Release 11g became available in 2007. Oracle Corporation released Oracle Database 11g Release 2 in September 2009. This version was available in four commercial editions—Enterprise Edition, Standard Edition, Standard Edition One, and Personal Edition—and in one free edition—the Express Edition. The licensing of these editions shows various restrictions and obligations that were called complex by licensing expert Freirich Florea. The Enterprise Edition (DB EE), the most expensive of the Database Editions, has the fewest restrictions—but nevertheless has complex licensing. Oracle Corporation constrains the Standard Edition (DB SE) and Standard Edition One (SE1) with more licensing restrictions, in accordance with their lower price.
 Release 12: Release 12c (c standing for "cloud") became available on July 1, 2013.

Oracle Corporation has acquired and developed the following additional database technologies:
 Berkeley DB, which offers embedded database processing
 Oracle Rdb, a relational database system running on OpenVMS platforms. Oracle acquired Rdb in 1994 from Digital Equipment Corporation. Oracle has since made many enhancements to this product and development continues .
 TimesTen, which features in-memory database operations
 Oracle Essbase, which continues the Hyperion Essbase tradition of multi-dimensional database management
 MySQL, a relational database management system licensed under the GNU General Public License, initially developed by MySQL AB
 Oracle NoSQL Database, a scalable, distributed key-value NoSQL database

Middleware

Oracle Fusion Middleware is a family of middleware software products, including (for instance) application server, system integration, business process management (BPM), user interaction, content management, identity management and business intelligence (BI) products.

Oracle Secure Enterprise Search
Oracle Secure Enterprise Search (SES), Oracle's enterprise-search offering, gives users the ability to search for content across multiple locations, including websites, XML files, file servers, content management systems, enterprise resource planning systems, customer relationship management systems, business intelligence systems, and databases.

Oracle Beehive

Released in 2008, the Oracle Beehive collaboration software provides team workspaces (including wikis, team calendaring and file sharing), email, calendar, instant messaging, and conferencing on a single platform. Customers can use Beehive as licensed software or as software as a service ("SaaS").

Applications
Following a number of acquisitions beginning in 2003, especially in the area of applications, Oracle Corporation  maintains a number of product lines:

 Oracle E-Business Suite
 PeopleSoft Enterprise
 Siebel
 JD Edwards
 JD Edwards EnterpriseOne
 JD Edwards World
 Merchandise Operations Management (Formerly Retek)
 Planning & Optimisation 
 Store Operations (Formerly 360Commerce)

Development of applications commonly takes place in Java (using Oracle JDeveloper) or through PL/SQL (using, for example, Oracle Forms and Oracle Reports/BIPublisher). Oracle Corporation has started a drive toward "wizard"-driven environments with a view to enabling non-programmers to produce simple data-driven applications.

Third-party applications
Oracle Corporation works with "Oracle Certified Partners" to enhance its overall product marketing. The variety of applications from third-party vendors includes database applications for archiving, splitting and control, ERP and CRM systems, as well as more niche and focused products providing a range of commercial functions in areas like human resources, financial control and governance, risk management, and compliance (GRC). Vendors include Hewlett-Packard, Creoal Consulting, UC4 Software, Motus, and Knoa Software.

Enterprise management

Oracle Enterprise Manager (OEM) provides web-based monitoring and management tools for Oracle products (and for some third-party software), including database management, middleware management, application management, hardware and virtualization management and cloud management.

The Primavera products of Oracle's Construction & Engineering Global Business Unit (CEGBU) consist of project-management software.

Development software
Oracle Corporation's tools for developing applications include (among others):

 Oracle Designer – a CASE tool which integrates with Oracle Developer Suite
 Oracle Developer – which consists of Oracle Forms, Oracle Discoverer and Oracle Reports
 Oracle JDeveloper, a freeware IDE
 NetBeans, a Java-based software-development platform
 Oracle Application Express – also known as APEX; for web-oriented development
 Oracle SQL Developer, an integrated development environment for working with SQL-based databases
 Oracle SQL*Plus Worksheet, a component of Oracle Enterprise Manager (OEM)
 OEPE, Oracle Enterprise Pack for Eclipse
 Open Java Development Kit
 Oracle Developer Studio – a software generation system for the development of C, C++, Fortran, and Java software
 Oracle Visual Builder Studio
Many external and third-party tools make the Oracle database administrator's tasks easier.

File systems 
 ZFS combines file-system and logical volume management functionality.
 BtrFS "B-tree File-System" is meant to be an improvement over the existing Linux ext4 filesystem, and offer features approaching those of ZFS.

Operating systems
Oracle Corporation develops and supports two operating systems: Oracle Solaris and Oracle Linux.

Hardware

 The Sun hardware range acquired by Oracle Corporation's purchase of Sun Microsystems
 Oracle SPARC T-series servers and M-series mainframes developed and released after Sun acquisition
 Engineered systems: pre-engineered and pre-assembled hardware/software bundles for enterprise use
 Exadata Database Machine – hardware/software integrated storage
 Exalogic Elastic Cloud – hardware/software integrated application server
 Exalytics In-Memory Machine – hardware/software integrated in-memory analytics server
 Oracle Database Appliance
 Big Data Appliance – integrated map-reduce/big data solution
 SPARC SuperCluster T4-4 – a general purpose engineered system

Services

Oracle Cloud
Oracle Cloud is a cloud computing service offered by Oracle Corporation providing servers, storage, network, applications and services through a global network of Oracle Corporation managed data centers. The company allows these services to be provisioned on demand over the Internet.

Oracle Cloud provides Infrastructure as a Service (IaaS), Platform as a Service (PaaS), Software as a Service (SaaS) and Data as a Service (DaaS). These services are used to build, deploy, integrate and extend applications in the cloud. This platform supports open standards (SQL, HTML5, REST, etc.) open-source solutions (Kubernetes, Hadoop, Kafka, etc.) and a variety of programming languages, databases, tools and frameworks including Oracle-specific, free and third-party software and systems.
 Software as a Service (SaaS)
 Enterprise applications: SCM, EPM, HCM, ERP and CX SaaS offerings
Oracle sells a SaaS suite of Oracle Fusion Applications business applications.
On July 28, 2016, Oracle bought NetSuite, the first cloud company, for $9.3 billion. NetSuite provides cloud ERP, CRM, supply chain and e-commerce software to small and medium-sized businesses. It is regarded as the first fully cloud company in the world and is an industry leader in its own right.
 Platform as a Service (PaaS)
 Oracle has branded its Platform as a Service as Oracle Cloud Platform. Oracle Cloud Platform include Data Management, Application Development, Integration, Content and Experience, Business Analytics, Management and Security. 
 Platform services on which to build and deploy applications or extend SaaS applications: database, Java application server, mobile, business analytics, integration, process, big data, Internet of Things, Node.js etc.
 Data as a Service (DaaS)
 Oracle Data Cloud is composed of several acquisitions including AddThis, BlueKai, Crosswise, Datalogix, Grapeshot, and Moat.
 Infrastructure as a Service (IaaS) 
 Oracle has branded its Infrastructure as a Service as Oracle Cloud Infrastructure (OCI). Oracle Cloud Infrastructure offerings include the following services.
 Compute Service
 Storage Service
 Network Service

On May 16, 2018, Oracle announced that it had acquired DataScience.com, a privately held cloud workspace platform for data science projects and workloads.

Other services
 Oracle Consulting – technical and business expert services
 Oracle Financing 
 Oracle Marketing & Support 
 Product support: Oracle Corporation identifies its customers and their support entitlements using CSI (Customer Support Identifier) codes. Registered customers can submit Service Requests (SRs)—usually via the web-accessible My Oracle Support (MOS), a re-incarnation of Oracle Metalink with web access administered by a site Customer User Administrator (CUA).
 Critical Patch Updates: since 2005 Oracle Corporation has grouped collections of patches and security fixes for its products each quarter into a "Critical Patch Update" (CPU), released each January, April, July and October.
 Oracle Configuration Manager (OCM, previously Customer Configuration repository or CCR) gathers and uploads details of the configuration of Oracle software.
 Oracle Auto Service Request (ASR) automatically creates Service Requests for specific hardware faults on qualified Oracle server, storage, Oracle Exadata, and Oracle Exalogic products.
 My Oracle Support Community (MOSC)
 Oracle University (training in Oracle products)
 Oracle Certification Program
 NetSuite Social Impact program assists nonprofits with moving operations to the cloud.  In October 2018, Oracle announced the expansion of the program to include product donation, pro bono expansion and online community building. 
 As of September 13, 2020, Oracle acquired a trade deal with the ByteDance owned social video platform TikTok. This was the result of an executive order issued by U.S. president Donald Trump stating that TikTok must be sold to a U.S. company by September 15, 2020. The exact nature of the agreement is still unknown, but it implies that Oracle will become TikTok's technology partner and assume responsibility for the company's U.S. user data. The agreement is still pending approval from regulatory government bodies.

Marketing

Sales practices
In 1990, Oracle laid off 10% (about 400 people) of its work force because of accounting errors. This crisis came about because of Oracle's "up-front" marketing strategy, in which sales people urged potential customers to buy the largest possible amount of software all at once. The sales people then booked the value of future license sales in the current quarter, thereby increasing their bonuses. This became a problem when the future sales subsequently failed to materialize. Oracle eventually had to restate its earnings twice, and also settled (out of court) class-action lawsuits arising from its having overstated its earnings. Ellison stated in 1992 that Oracle had made "an incredible business mistake".

Competition
In 1994, Informix overtook Sybase and became Oracle's most important rival. The intense war between Informix CEO Phil White and Ellison made front-page news in Silicon Valley for three years. Informix claimed that Oracle had hired away Informix engineers to disclose important trade secrets about an upcoming product. Informix finally dropped its lawsuit against Oracle in 1997. In November 2005, a book detailing the war between Oracle and Informix was published, titled The Real Story of Informix Software and Phil White. It gave a detailed chronology of the battle of Informix against Oracle, and how Informix Software's CEO Phil White landed in jail because of his obsession with overtaking Ellison.

Once it had overcome Informix and Sybase, Oracle Corporation enjoyed years of dominance in the database market until use of Microsoft SQL Server became widespread in the late 1990s and IBM acquired Informix Software in 2001 (to complement its Db2 database).  Oracle competes for new database licenses on UNIX, GNU, and Windows operating systems primarily against IBM's Db2 and Microsoft SQL Server. IBM's Db2  dominates the mainframe database market.

In 2004, Oracle's sales grew at a rate of 14.5% to $6.2 billion, giving it 41.3% and the top share of the relational-database market (InformationWeek – March 2005), with market share estimated at up to 44.6% in 2005 by some sources.
Oracle Corporation's main competitors in the database arena remain IBM Db2 and Microsoft SQL Server, and to a lesser extent Sybase and Teradata, with free databases such as PostgreSQL and MySQL also having a significant share of the market. EnterpriseDB, based on PostgreSQL, has  made inroads by proclaiming that its product delivers Oracle compatibility features at a much lower price-point.

In the software-applications market, Oracle Corporation primarily competes against SAP. On March 22, 2007, Oracle sued SAP, accusing them of fraud and unfair competition.

In the market for business intelligence software, many other software companies—small and large—have successfully competed in quality with Oracle and SAP products. Business intelligence vendors can be categorized into the "big four" consolidated BI firms such as Oracle, who has entered BI market through a recent trend of acquisitions (including Hyperion Solutions), and the independent "pure play" vendors such as MicroStrategy, Actuate, and SAS.

Oracle Financials was ranked in the Top 20 Most Popular Accounting Software Infographic by Capterra in 2014, beating out SAP and a number of their other competitors.

Oracle and SAP
From 1988, Oracle Corporation and the German company SAP AG had a decade-long history of cooperation, beginning with the integration of SAP's R/3 enterprise application suite with Oracle's relational database products. Despite the SAP partnership with Microsoft, and the increasing integration of SAP applications with Microsoft products (such as Microsoft SQL Server, a competitor to Oracle Database), Oracle and SAP continue their cooperation. According to Oracle Corporation, the majority of SAP's customers use Oracle databases.

In 2004, Oracle began to increase its interest in the enterprise-applications market (in 1989, Oracle had already released Oracle Financials). A series of acquisitions by Oracle Corporation began, most notably with those of PeopleSoft, Siebel Systems and Hyperion.

SAP recognized that Oracle had started to become a competitor in a markets where SAP had the leadership, and saw an opportunity to lure in customers from those companies that Oracle Corporation had acquired. SAP would offer those customers special discounts on the licenses for its enterprise applications.

Oracle Corporation would resort to a similar strategy, by advising SAP customers to get "OFF SAP" (a play on the words of the acronym for its middleware platform "Oracle Fusion for SAP"),
and also by providing special discounts on licenses and services to SAP customers who chose Oracle Corporation products.

 Oracle and SAP (the latter through its recently acquired subsidiary TomorrowNow) compete in the third-party enterprise software maintenance and support market. On March 22, 2007, Oracle filed a lawsuit against SAP. In Oracle Corporation v. SAP AG Oracle alleged that TomorrowNow, which provides discount support for legacy Oracle product lines, used the accounts of former Oracle customers to systematically download patches and support documents from Oracle's website and to appropriate them for SAP's use.
Some analysts have suggested the suit could form part of a strategy by Oracle Corporation to decrease competition with SAP in the market for third-party enterprise software maintenance and support.

On July 3, 2007, SAP admitted that TomorrowNow employees had made "inappropriate downloads" from the Oracle support website. However, it claims that SAP personnel and SAP customers had no access to Oracle intellectual property via TomorrowNow. SAP's CEO Henning Kagermann stated that "Even a single inappropriate download is unacceptable from my perspective. We regret very much that this occurred." Additionally, SAP announced that it had "instituted changes" in TomorrowNow's operational oversight.

On November 23, 2010, a U.S. district court jury in Oakland, California found that SAP AG must pay Oracle Corp $1.3 billion for copyright infringement, awarding damages that could be the largest-ever for copyright infringement. While admitting liability, SAP estimated the damages at no more than $40 million, while Oracle claimed that they are at least $1.65 billion. The awarded amount is one of the 10 or 20 largest jury verdicts in U.S. legal history. SAP said they were disappointed by the verdict and might appeal. On September 1, 2011, a federal judge overturned the judgment and offered a reduced amount or a new trial, calling Oracle's original award "grossly" excessive. Oracle chose a new trial.

On August 3, 2012, SAP and Oracle agreed on a judgment for $306 million in damages, pending approval from the U.S. district court judge, “to save time and expense of [a] new trial". After the accord has been approved, Oracle can ask a federal appeals court to reinstate the earlier jury verdict. In addition to the damages payment, SAP has already paid Oracle $120 million for its legal fees.

Slogans
 "Information driven"
 For the Oracle Database: "Can't break it, can't break in" and "Unbreakable"
 Enabling the Information Age
 Enabling the Information Age Through Network Computing"
 : "The Information Company"
 As of 2010: "Software. Hardware. Complete."
 As of late 2010: "Hardware and Software, Engineered to Work Together"
 As of mid 2015: "Integrated Cloud Applications and Platform Services"

Media
Oracle Corporation produces and distributes the "Oracle ClearView" series of videos as part of its marketing mix.

Finances 

Oracle was ranked No. 82 in the 2018 Fortune 500 list of the largest United States corporations by total revenue. According to Bloomberg, Oracle's CEO-to-employee pay ratio is 1,205:1. The CEO's compensation in 2017 was $108,295,023. Oracle is one of the approved employers of ACCA and the median employee compensation rate was $89,887.

Carbon footprint
Oracle reported total carbon dioxide equivalent (CO2e) emissions (direct + indirect) for the twelve months ending December 31, 2020 at 428 kilotonnes (+63/+17% year over year) and plans to reduce emissions 26% by 2025 from a 2015 base year.

Controversies

Trashgate
In 2000, Oracle attracted attention from the computer industry and the press after hiring private investigators to dig through the trash of organizations involved in an antitrust trial against Microsoft. The Chairman of Oracle Corporation, Larry Ellison, staunchly defended his company's hiring of an East Coast detective agency to investigate groups that supported rival Microsoft Corporation during its antitrust trial, calling the snooping a "public service". The investigation reportedly included a $1,200 offer to janitors at the Association for Competitive Technology to look through Microsoft's trash. When asked how he would feel if others were looking into Oracle's business activities, Ellison said: "We will ship our garbage to Redmond, and they can go through it. We believe in full disclosure."

"Can't break it, can't break in"
In 2002, Oracle Corporation marketed many of its products using the slogan "Can't break it, can't break in", or "Unbreakable". This signified a claim of information security. Oracle Corporation also stressed the reliability of networked databases and network access to databases as major selling points.

However, two weeks after its introduction, David Litchfield, Alexander Kornbrust, Cesar Cerrudo and others demonstrated a whole suite of successful attacks against Oracle products. Oracle Corporation's chief security officer Mary Ann Davidson said that, rather than representing a literal claim of Oracle's products' impregnability, she saw the campaign in the context of fourteen independent security evaluations that Oracle Corporation's database server had passed.

Relationship with John Ashcroft
In 2004, then-United States Attorney General John Ashcroft sued Oracle Corporation to prevent it from acquiring a multibillion-dollar intelligence contract. After Ashcroft's resignation from government, he founded a lobbying firm, The Ashcroft Group, which Oracle hired in 2005. With the group's help, Oracle went on to acquire the contract.

Expeditionary Combat Support System
Computer Sciences Corporation, as the prime contractor, reportedly spent a billion dollars developing the Expeditionary Combat Support System for the United States Air Force. It yielded no significant capability, because, according to an Air Force source, the prime contractor "was simply not up to the task of adapting" the Oracle software, on which the system was based, to meet the specialized performance criteria.

Cover Oregon Healthcare Exchange
Oracle Corporation was awarded a contract by the State of Oregon's Oregon Health Authority (OHA) to develop Cover Oregon, the state's healthcare exchange website, as part of the U.S. Patient Protection and Affordable Care Act. When the site tried to go live on October 1, 2013, it failed, and registrations had to be taken using paper applications until the site could be fixed.

On April 25, 2014, the State of Oregon voted to discontinue Cover Oregon and instead use the federal exchange to enroll Oregon residents. The cost of switching to the federal portal was estimated at $5 million, whereas fixing Cover Oregon would have required another $78 million.

Oracle president Safra Catz responded to Cover Oregon and the OHA in a letter claiming that the site's problems were due to OHA mismanagement, specifically that a third-party systems integrator was not hired to manage the complex project.

In August 2014, Oracle Corporation sued Cover Oregon for breach of contract, and then later that month the state of Oregon sued Oracle Corporation, in a civil complaint for breach of contract, fraud, filing false claims and "racketeering". In September 2016, the two sides reached a settlement valued at over $100 million to the state, and a six-year agreement for Oracle to continue modernizing state software and IT.

Class action tracking lawsuit
On August 23, 2022, Oracle was hit with a class action lawsuit by Lieff Cabraser representing Michael Katz-Lacabe, Dr. Jennifer Golbeck and Dr. Johnny Ryan, the latter of which is a senior fellow at the Irish Council for Civil Liberties. The lawsuit, which demands a jury trial, alleges that Oracle has engaged in "deliberate and purposeful surveillance of the general population via their digital and online existence", specifically focusing on Oracle operating a surveillance machine which tracks in real-time and records indefinitely the personal information of hundreds of millions of people. The litigants against Oracle argue that through such surveillance, the company violates the Federal Electronic Communications Privacy Act, California's state constitution, the California Invasion of Privacy Act, competition law, and California Common Law.

Violations of the Foreign Corrupt Practices Act 
in 2012 Oracle agreed to pay about $2 million to the Securities and Exchange Commission (SEC). The SEC at the time alleged that the company's India subsidiary structured transactions with foreign governments in a way that enabled them to hold about $2.2 million of the proceeds inside funds that could be used for unauthorized purposes and therefore being a violation of the Foreign Corrupt Practices Act.

In 2022 the Securities and Exchange Commission announced settled charges requiring Oracle Corporation to pay more than $23 million to resolve charges that it violated provisions of the Foreign Corrupt Practices Act when subsidiaries in Turkey, the United Arab Emirates (UAE), and India created and used slush funds to bribe foreign officials in return for business between 2016 and 2019.

Events

Acquisition of Sun Microsystems

In January 2010, Oracle completed its acquisition of Sun Microsystems—valued at more than $7 billion—a move that transformed Oracle from solely a software company to a manufacturer of both software and hardware. The acquisition was delayed for several months by the European Commission because of concerns about MySQL, but was unconditionally approved in the end. In September 2011, U.S. State Department Embassy cables were leaked to WikiLeaks. One cable revealed that the U.S. pressured the E.U. to allow Oracle to acquire Sun.

The Sun acquisition was closely watched by free software users and some companies, due to the fear that Oracle might end Sun's traditional support of free projects. Since the acquisition, Oracle has discontinued OpenSolaris and StarOffice, and sued Google over the Java patents Oracle acquired from Sun.

Fraud Accusations by the US Department of Justice
On July 29, 2010, the United States Department of Justice (DoJ) filed suit against Oracle Corporation alleging fraud. The lawsuit argues that the government received deals inferior to those Oracle gave to its commercial clients. The DoJ added its heft to an already existing whistleblower lawsuit filed by Paul Frascella, who was once senior director of contract services at Oracle. It was settled in 2011.

Lawsuit against Google

Background 
Oracle, the plaintiff, acquired ownership of the Java computer programing language when it acquired Sun Microsystems in January 2010. The Java software includes sets of pre-developed software code to allow programs and apps to accomplish common tasks in a consistent manner. The pre-developed code is organized into separate "packages" which each contain a set of "classes". Each class contains numerous methods, which instruct a program or app to do a certain task. Software developers "became accustomed to using Java’s designations at the package, class, and method level".

Oracle and Google (the defendant) tried to negotiate an agreement for Oracle to license Java to Google, which would have allowed Google to use Java in developing programs for mobile devices using the Android operating system. However, the two companies never reached an agreement. After negotiations failed, Google created its own programming platform, which was based on Java, and contained 37 copied Java packages as well as new packages developed by Google.

First trial 
In 2010, Oracle sued Google for copyright infringement for the use of the 37 Java packages. The case was handled in U.S. District Court for the Northern District of California and assigned to Judge William Alsup (who taught himself how to code computers). In the lawsuit, Oracle sought between $1.4 billion and $6.1 billion. In June 2011 the judge had to force Google through a judicial order to make public the details about Oracle's claim for damages.

By the end of the first jury trial (the legal dispute would eventually go on to another trial) the arguments made by Oracle's attorneys focused on a Java function called "rangeCheck"."The argument centered on a function called rangeCheck. Of all the lines of code that Oracle had tested—15 million in total—these were the only ones that were 'literally' copied. Every keystroke, a perfect duplicate." – The Verge, 10/19/17Although Google admitted to copying the packages, Judge Alsup found that none of the Java packages were covered under copyright protection, and therefore Google did not infringe.

First appeal 
After the case was over, Oracle appealed to the United States Court of Appeals for the Federal Circuit (750 F.3d 1339 (2014)). On May 9, 2014, the appeals court partially reversed Judge Alsup's decision, finding that Java APIs are copyrightable. API stands for "application programming interface" and are how different computer programs or apps communicate with each other. However, the appeals court also left open the possibility that Google might have a "fair use" defense.

Supreme Court petition 
On October 6, 2014, Google filed a petition to appeal to the U.S. Supreme Court, but the Supreme Court denied the petition.

Second trial 
The case was then returned to the U.S. District Court for another trial about Google's fair use defense. Oracle sought $9 billion in damages. In May 2016, the trial jury found that Google's use of Java's APIs was considered fair use.

Second appeal 
In February 2017, Oracle filed another appeal to the U.S. Court of Appeals for the Federal Circuit. This time it was asking for a new trial because the District Court "repeatedly undermined Oracle's case", which Oracle argued led the jury to make the wrong decision. According to ZDNet, "For example, it [Oracle] says the court wrongly bought Google's claim that Android was limited to smartphones while Java was for PCs, whereas Oracle contends that Java and Android both compete as platforms for smart TVs, cars, and wearables."

Discontinuation of OpenSolaris
On August 13, 2010, an internal Oracle memo leaked to the Internet cited plans for ending the OpenSolaris operating system project and community. With Oracle planning to develop Solaris only in a closed source fashion, OpenSolaris developers moved to the Illumos and OpenIndiana project, among others.

Discontinuation of OpenSSO
As Oracle completed their acquisition of Sun Microsystems in February 2010, they announced that OpenSSO would no longer be their strategic product. Shortly after, OpenSSO was forked to OpenAM. and will continue to be developed and supported by ForgeRock.

Mark Hurd as president
On September 6, 2010, Oracle announced that former Hewlett-Packard CEO Mark Hurd was to replace Charles Phillips, who resigned as Oracle co-president. In an official statement made by Larry Ellison, Phillips had previously expressed his desire to transition out of the company. Ellison had asked Phillips to stay on through the integration of Sun Microsystems Inc. In a separate statement regarding the transition, Ellison said "Mark did a brilliant job at HP and I expect he'll do even better at Oracle. There is no executive in the IT world with more relevant experience than Mark."

On September 7, 2010, HP announced a civil lawsuit against Mark Hurd "to protect HP's trade secrets", in response to Oracle hiring Hurd. On September 20, Oracle and HP published a joint press release announcing the resolution of the lawsuit on confidential terms and reaffirming commitment to long-term strategic partnership between the companies.

OpenOffice.org issue
A number of OpenOffice.org developers formed The Document Foundation and received backing by Google, Novell, Red Hat, and Canonical, as well as some others, but were unable to get Oracle to donate the brand OpenOffice.org, causing a fork in the development of OpenOffice.org with the foundation now developing and promoting LibreOffice. Oracle expressed no interest in sponsoring the new project and asked the OpenOffice.org developers that started the project to resign from the company due to "conflicts of interest". On November 1, 2010, 33 of the OpenOffice.org developers gave their letters of resignation. On June 1, 2011, Oracle donated OpenOffice.org to the Apache Software Foundation.

HP and Oracle lawsuit
On June 15, 2011, HP filed a lawsuit in California Superior Court in Santa Clara, claiming that Oracle had breached an agreement to support the Itanium microprocessor used in HP's high-end enterprise servers. Oracle called the lawsuit "an abuse of the judicial process" and said that had it known SAP's Léo Apotheker was about to be hired as HP's new CEO, any support for HP's Itanium servers would not have been implied.

On August 1, 2012, a California judge said in a tentative ruling that Oracle must continue porting its software at no cost until HP discontinues its sales of Itanium-based servers. HP was awarded $3 billion in damages against Oracle in 2016. HP argued Oracle's canceling support damaged HP's Itanium server brand. Oracle had announced that it would appeal both the decision and damages, but the decision stayed.

Foreign corrupt practices 
On August 31, 2011, The Wall Street Journal reported that Oracle was being investigated by the Federal Bureau of Investigation for paying bribes to government officials in order to win business in Africa, in contravention of the Foreign Corrupt Practices Act (FCPA).

In September 2022, Oracle settled with the U.S. Securities and Exchange Commission (SEC) without admitting or denying its findings, by agreeing to pay $23 million to settle the charges. The SEC announced that Oracle violated the FCPA between 2014 and 2019 when its subsidiaries in India, Turkey and UAE created slush funds to bribe foreign officials in order to win business.

GSA business bidding ban
On April 20, 2012, the US General Services Administration banned Oracle from the most popular portal for bidding on GSA contracts for undisclosed reasons. Oracle has previously used this portal for around four hundred million dollars a year in revenue. Oracle previously settled a lawsuit filed under the False Claims Act, which accused the company of overbilling the US government between 1998 and 2006. The 2011 settlement forced Oracle to pay $199.5 million to the General Services Administration.

U.S. TikTok's operations 
On September 13, 2020, Bloomberg News reported that Oracle won a bidding war with other U.S.-based companies to take over social media company TikTok's operations in the United States following the company's pressure to forcibly be shut down by the Trump Administration. Oracle was described as a “trusted tech partner” by TikTok, suggesting the deal may not be as structured as an outright sale. On September 19, 2020, the Trump Administration approved of the sale of TikTok's US operations to Oracle "[delaying] — by one week — restrictions that were originally to take effect" on September 20 as indicated by the United States Department of Commerce.

On February 10, 2021, The Wall Street Journal reported, citing a source familiar with the matter, the Biden Administration would be backing off from banning TikTok and shelving the sale of TikTok indefinitely, as the U.S. Commerce Department began reviewing whether or not Trump's claims about TikTok can justify the attempts to ban it.

People
 Larry Ellison: executive chairman and CTO (since September 2014), co-founder of the company, previously CEO (1977–2014), previously chairman (1990–2004). He owns 36% of the company.
 Safra Catz: CEO (since September 2014), previously co-president (since 2004) and CFO. In 2016, she was ranked tenth on Fortune's Most Powerful Women list.
 Jeff Henley: vice chairman (since September 2014), previously chairman (2004–2014) and CFO (1991–2004).
 Mark Hurd: former CEO (2014–2019), previously co-president (2010–2014). In 2007, Mark Hurd was ranked  on Fortunes list of the 25 Most Powerful People in Business. He died in 2019.
 Charles Phillips: former co-president and director (2003–2010); replaced by Mark Hurd.
 Bob Miner: co-founder of the company and co-architect of Oracle Database. Led product design and development for Oracle Database (1977–1992). Spun off a technology group within Oracle in 1992. Oracle board member until 1993.  He died in 1994.
 Ed Oates: co-founder of the company. Retired from Oracle in 1996.
 Umang Gupta: former vice president and general manager (1981–1984). Wrote the first business plan for the company. 
 Bruce Scott: The first hired employee (after the co-founders; employee number 4) at Oracle (then Software Development Laboratories). Scott served as the co-author and co-architect of the Oracle database up to Version 3.  He left Oracle in 1982.

Offices
Since December 2020, Oracle Corporation's world headquarters has been located in Austin, Texas. Oracle has plans to build its largest office hub, with 8500 jobs, in Nashville within the next few decades.

Oracle has a large office complex located on the San Francisco Peninsula in the Redwood Shores area of Redwood City. This complex was home to Oracle world headquarters from 1989 to 2020.  It is located on the former site of Marine World/Africa USA, which moved from Redwood Shores to Vallejo in 1986. Oracle Corporation originally leased two buildings on the Oracle Parkway site, moving its finance and administration departments from the corporation's former headquarters on Davis Drive, Belmont, California. Eventually, Oracle purchased the complex and constructed four additional buildings.

The distinctive Oracle Parkway buildings, nicknamed the Emerald City, served as sets for the futuristic headquarters of the fictional company "NorthAm Robotics" in the Robin Williams film Bicentennial Man (1999). The campus also represented the headquarters of Cyberdyne Systems in the movie Terminator Genisys (2015).

Corporate structures 
Oracle Corporation operates in multiple markets and has acquired several companies which formerly functioned autonomously. In some cases these provided the starting points for global business units (GBUs) targeting particular vertical markets. Oracle Corporation GBUs include:

 Communications
 Construction and engineering - formerly the Primavera GBU
 Financial services 
 Food and Beverages
 Health sciences
 Hospitality
 Retail
 Energy and Water

Sponsorships

On October 20, 2006, the Golden State Warriors and the Oracle Corporation announced a 10-year agreement in which the Oakland Arena would become known as the Oracle Arena. The agreement ended after the 2018-2019 NBA season when the Warriors relocated to the Chase Center in San Francisco.

Larry Ellison's sailing team competes as Oracle Team USA. The team has won the America's Cup twice, in 2010 (as BMW Oracle Racing) and in 2013, despite being penalized for cheating.

Sean Tucker's "Challenger II" stunt biplane is sponsored by Oracle and performs frequently at air shows around the US.

In January 2019, the San Francisco Giants entered into a 20-year agreement to rename their stadium Oracle Park.

From the 2022 Formula One season, Oracle signed a 5-year deal worth $500m to become title sponsors of Red Bull Racing. In 1994 and 1995, Oracle sponsored Benetton. It was revealed in July 2022 that NASCAR's Joe Gibbs Racing team tried to sign a sponsorship with Oracle after Mars Inc. would announce they would leave JGR after the 2022 season, but the deal reportedly fell through.

See also

 List of acquisitions by Oracle
 Oracle Applications
 Oracle Certification Program
 Oracle Clinical
 Oracle Database
 Oracle Linux
 Oracle User Group
 Cover Oregon

References

Further reading

External links

  

 

 
1977 establishments in California
1980s initial public offerings
American companies established in 1977
Business software companies
Cloud computing providers
Companies based in Austin, Texas
Companies formerly listed on the Nasdaq
Companies listed on the New York Stock Exchange
Computer companies established in 1977
Software companies established in 1977
Computer companies of the United States
Computer storage companies
Customer relationship management software companies
Data companies
Development software companies
ERP software companies
Linux companies
Multinational companies headquartered in the United States
Software companies based in Texas
Supply chain software companies
Software companies of the United States
Cloud applications
Business intelligence companies
Human resource management software
Larry Ellison